Stubb Drainage Windmill is 1.9 miles east of Hickling in the English county of Norfolk. The Windmill is a Grade II listed building and was given this status on 30 September 1987. The estimate is that there were once about 200 wind powered drainage windmills in the Broadlands. Stubb Drainage windmill is listed as one that is at risk of decay by Norfolk County Council.

History
Stubb Windmill is a towermill which was built between the years 1795 and 1825 along with several other drainage windmills by Sir George Berney Brograve. Water discharged from Stubb mill flowed into Meadow dyke vie drains that were also constructed at the time, one of which is called the Commissioners drain. This work resulted in the loss of three small broads which were called Wigg's, Gag's and Hare Park Broads.

References

External links

Towers completed in 1825
Infrastructure completed in 1825
Windmills in Norfolk
Tower mills in the United Kingdom
Grade II listed buildings in Norfolk
Grade II listed windmills
Hickling, Norfolk